The Streeter–Peterson House, located at 1121 9th St. in Aurora, Nebraska, was built in 1900 by local builders Johnson & Henthorn. It is designed in "classical" Queen Anne style. It was listed on the National Register of Historic Places in 1991; the listing included two contributing buildings.

The home was built for the family William H. Streeter, a founding personage in the banking field of the area, and was later owned by A. Einer Peterson, a successful merchant to the fields of education and medicine.

It was deemed significant as "a significant local example of early twentieth century Neoclassical Queen Anne domestic architecture in Aurora, Nebraska". It was evaluated to be "the most impressive and architecturally sophisticated" of comparables in Aurora.

References

External links 
More photos of the Streeter–Peterson House at Wikimedia Commons

Houses on the National Register of Historic Places in Nebraska
Queen Anne architecture in Nebraska
Neoclassical architecture in Nebraska
Houses completed in 1900
Houses in Hamilton County, Nebraska
National Register of Historic Places in Hamilton County, Nebraska